Wilhelm P. Krüger (29 August 1883 – 12 July 1959) was a German stage and film actor.

Selected filmography
 Flachsmann the Educator (1930)
 Trouble with Jolanthe (1934)
 Every Day Isn't Sunday (1935)
 When the Cock Crows (1936)
 My Friend Barbara (1937)
 Don't Promise Me Anything (1937)
 The Divine Jetta (1937)
 Autobus S (1937)
 White Slaves (1937)
 You and I (1938)
 The Four Companions (1938)
 Cadets (1939)
 Target in the Clouds (1939)
 Bismarck (1940)
 The Gasman (1941)
 The Girl from Fano (1941)
 Carl Peters (1941)
 Her Other Self (1941)
 Bismarck's Dismissal (1942)
 Geheimakte W.B.1 (1942)
 Elephant Fury (1953)

References

Bibliography
 Chandler, Charlotte. Ingrid: Ingrid Bergman, A Personal Biography. Simon and Schuster, 2007.

External links
 

1883 births
1959 deaths
German male film actors
German male stage actors